Louis Johnson (1930-2020) was a Black American dancer, choreographer, teacher, and director who worked across artistic genres in dance.

Johnson was born on March 19, 1930, in Statesville, North Carolina, and grew up in Washington, DC. His early dance training was with Doris Jones and Claire Haywood. In 1950, he was accepted to George Balanchine's School of American Ballet where Black students were uncommon. Of his time in the school, Johnson recalled, "I had started out at the beginning and worked my way up the class levels… I was in advanced classes with Jacques d’Amboise, Eddie Villella, Melissa Hayden, Andre Eglevsky, Tanaquil LeClercq, Maria Tallchief. They were my peers at the time… It was a learning experience like no other.”Although he was not hired as a full member of the New York City Ballet, Johnson was a guest artist and premiered a role in Jerome Robbins' Ballade (1952) in a cast that included Tanaquil Leclercq and Nora Kaye. He performed in Broadway shows including Four Saints in Three Acts (1952), My Darlin'Aida (1952), House of Flowers (1955) (choreographer: George Balanchine), Damn Yankees (1955 (choreographer: Bob Fosse), and Hallelujah Baby (1967).

Johnson choreographed the ballet Lament for the New York City Ballet Club in 1953. This was followed by many more stagings of ballets for companies including the Dance Theatre of Harlem, Alvin Ailey American Dance Theater, Cincinnati Ballet, Joffrey Ballet, and Philadanco. One of Johnson's most famous works is Forces of Rhythm (1972). When he was choreographing this work for the Dance Theatre of Harlem, cast member Virginia Johnson recalled, "he didn’t want you to parrot what he was doing. He wanted you to be painting inside the lines in the most beautiful colors that you could imagine.”  He created the choreography for the  Broadway shows: Purlie (1970) -- for which he was nominated for a Tony award, Lost in the Stars (1972), and Treemonisha (1975). He was the choreographer for the films: Cotton Comes to Harlem (1970), The Wiz (1978), Tales of Erotica (1996), and Baby of the Family (2002).

Continuing his genre-crossing career, Johnson was a choreographer for the Metropolitan Opera for productions including La Giaconda and Aida—starring Leontyne Price. As an educator, he directed the dance department of Henry Street Settlement in New York City from 1980 to 2003. He started Howard University’s Dance Department in Washington, D.C., and taught the first Black theatre course at Yale University.

Johnson’s honors include the Pioneer Award from the International Association of Blacks in Dance and honor from the California chapter of the NAACP for his work with the original Negro Ensemble Company.

Johnson died on March 31, 2020.

References

1930 births
2020 deaths
20th-century African-American people
21st-century African-American people
Dancers from North Carolina
People from Statesville, North Carolina